Cenchrometopa curvinervis is a species of ulidiid or picture-winged fly in the genus Cenchrometopa of the family Ulidiidae.

References

Ulidiidae